Cyrus Aldrich (June 18, 1808 – October 5, 1871)  was a U.S. Representative from Minnesota.

Aldrich was born in Smithfield, Rhode Island, June 18, 1808. He followed the occupations of sailor, boatman, farmer, contractor on public works, and mail contractor, and moved to Illinois and settled in Alton in 1837. In Alton, he was member of the Illinois House of Representatives 1845 – 1847; register of deeds of Jo Daviess County 1847 – 1849; Aldrich moved to Minneapolis, Minnesota, in 1855 and engaged in the lumber business, and was elected as a Republican to the Thirty-sixth and Thirty-seventh congresses (March 4, 1859 – March 3, 1863) where he was chairman of the Committee on Indian Affairs (Thirty-seventh Congress). Aldrich was not a candidate for renomination in 1862; unsuccessful candidate for election in 1863 to the United States Senate. He became a member of the State house of representatives in 1865; elected chairman of the board of supervisors of the town of Minneapolis in 1865; appointed by Abraham Lincoln in 1863 one of the commissioners to examine claims for indemnity of those who had suffered from the Dakota War of 1862, and was postmaster of Minneapolis, Minnesota, from September 11, 1867, until April 15, 1871, when a successor was appointed; died in Minneapolis, Minnesota, October 5, 1871.

He is the namesake of the city of Aldrich, Minnesota.

He was married to Clara A. Heaton and the couple had 4 children together; 3 daughters and 1 son. Two of the daughters, Clara and Abbey died in infancy. He, his wife, and four children are all buried at Lakewood Cemetery in Minneapolis, Minnesota.

References

Minnesota Legislators Past and Present

External links

1808 births
1871 deaths
People from Smithfield, Rhode Island
Republican Party members of the United States House of Representatives from Minnesota
Minnesota postmasters
Republican Party members of the Minnesota House of Representatives
Members of the Illinois House of Representatives
People from Alton, Illinois
Businesspeople from Minneapolis
Politicians from Minneapolis
19th-century American politicians